In computer graphics and computer vision, image-based modeling and rendering (IBMR) methods rely on a set of two-dimensional images of a scene to generate a three-dimensional model and then render some novel views of this scene.

The traditional approach of computer graphics has been used to create a geometric model in 3D and try to reproject it onto a two-dimensional image.  Computer vision, conversely, is mostly focused on detecting, grouping, and extracting features (edges, faces, etc.) present in a given picture and then trying to interpret them as three-dimensional clues.  Image-based modeling and rendering allows the use of multiple two-dimensional images in order to generate directly novel two-dimensional images, skipping the manual modeling stage.

Light modeling 
Instead of considering only the physical model of a solid, IBMR methods usually focus more on light modeling.  The fundamental concept behind IBMR is the plenoptic illumination function which is a parametrisation of the light field. The plenoptic function describes the light rays contained in a given volume. It can be represented with seven dimensions: a ray is defined by its position , its orientation , its wavelength  and its time : .  IBMR methods try to approximate the plenoptic function to render a novel set of two-dimensional images from another.  Given the high dimensionality of this function, practical methods place constraints on the parameters in order to reduce this number (typically to 2 to 4).

IBMR methods and algorithms
View morphing generates a transition between images
Panoramic imaging renders panoramas using image mosaics of individual still images
Lumigraph relies on a dense sampling of a scene
Space carving generates a 3D model based on a photo-consistency check

See also 
 View synthesis
 3D reconstruction
 Structure from motion

References

External links
 Quan, Long. Image-based modeling. Springer Science & Business Media, 2010. 
 
 
 
 

Computer graphics
Applications of computer vision
3D imaging